The women's downhill competition of the Vancouver 2010 Olympics was held at Whistler Creekside on Wednesday, February 17.

The women's downhill course runs on the top part of Wildcard, then the bottom of Jimmy's Joker, then finishes out of the valley on Lower Franz's Run. Finally the course merges with the Dave Murray Downhill at the Grandstand finish.

The course was labeled as extremely difficult for skiers and most training runs were cancelled due to weather conditions. This resulted in several accidents during the competition. The worst accident involved Swedish skier Anja Pärson, who lost balance on the last jump before the finish, which resulted in a  flight and subsequent fall, but without serious health consequences. Earlier in the same place Swiss skier Dominique Gisin fell; Pärson returned the very next day to win the bronze in the super combined.

Lindsey Vonn won the gold medal, teammate Julia Mancuso took the silver, and Elisabeth Görgl was the bronze medalist. Through 2019, it is the sole victory for the United States in the women's downhill at the Olympics. Görgl's mother Traudl Hecher was also a bronze medalist for Austria in this event in 1960 and 1964.

Results
Wednesday, February 17, 2010

The race was started at 11:00 local time, (UTC −8).

References

External links
 2010 Winter Olympics results: Ladies' Downhill, from https://web.archive.org/web/20091025194336/http://www.vancouver2010.com/; retrieved 2010-02-16.
 Ski Racing.com - Olympics: Vonn wins downhill gold, Mancuso silver - 2010-02-17
FIS Results

Downhill